This was the first edition of the tournament.

Matt Reid and Sergiy Stakhovsky won the title after defeating Marc-Andrea Hüsler and Gonçalo Oliveira 6–2, 6–3 in the final.

Seeds

Draw

References
 Main Draw

Cassis Open Provence - Doubles